Membrane dipeptidase (renal dipeptidase, dehydropeptidase I (DPH I), dipeptidase, aminodipeptidase, dipeptide hydrolase, dipeptidyl hydrolase, nonspecific dipeptidase, glycosyl-phosphatidylinositol-anchored renal dipeptidase, MBD, MDP, leukotriene D4 hydrolase) is an enzyme. This enzyme catalyses the following chemical reaction

 Hydrolysis of dipeptides (e.g., leukotriene D4, cystinyl-bis-glycine, some β-lactam antibiotics (e.g., carbapenem))

This membrane-bound, zinc enzyme has broad specificity.

Inhibitors include bestatin and cilastatin.

Genes
 Dipeptidase 1 (DPEP1)
 Dipeptidase 2 (DPEP2)
 Dipeptidase 3 (DPEP3)

References

External links 
 

EC 3.4.13